The flag of the Second Spanish Republic, known in Spanish as , was the official flag of Spain between 1931 and 1939 and the flag of the Spanish Republican government in exile until 1977. Its present-day use in Spain is associated with the modern republican movement, different trade unions and various left-wing political movements.

History
The Spanish republican flag began to be used on April 27, 1931, thirteen days after municipal elections results led to the abolition of the monarchy and the proclamation of the Second Spanish Republic.

This same flag had been previously displayed by certain Republican groups as an alternative to the red-and-yellow flag that they identified with the Bourbon monarchy in Spain. As a result of this previous use, the young republic proclaimed in 1931 eagerly adopted this symbol.

The Republican flag was adopted on April 27 and presented to the army of the nation on May 6 with the following words: "The national uprising against tyranny, victorious since April 14, has hoisted a flag that is invested by means of the feelings of the people with the double representation of the hope of freedom and of its irreversible triumph."
 
 
The Republican flag was formed by three horizontal bands of the same width, red, yellow, and dark purple. The National Flag would have the Spanish Republican coat of arms at the centre (quarterly of Castile, Leon, Aragon and Navarre, enté en point for Granada, ensigned by a mural crown, between the two Pillars of Hercules). This coat of arms originated in 1868 and had been used then by the Provisional Government and later by the First Spanish Republic. The civil ensign or merchant flag would be a simple tricolour without the coat of arms.

The term "la tricolor" to refer to the flag is reminiscent of the French tricolor which, since the French Revolution of the late 18th Century, has made a flag composed of three equal strips into the symbol of a Republic. However, having horizontal strips rather than vertical ones, as in the French flag, made it possible to preserve many elements of the previous Spanish flag, used during centuries of Monarchial rule.

During the Civil War there was also a military version of the flag with proportion 2:3 and without the coat of arms used by Republican Army units in different locations. Despite not displaying the arms, this plain flag did not correspond to the civil ensign approved in 1931 for the use of merchant ships. The International Brigades added a three-pointed red star to the yellow band of the military Republican flag.

The simplified military flag of the Second Spanish Republic was also used by the Spanish Maquis between the end of the Spanish Civil War and the early 1960s, and later by the Spanish National Liberation Front (FELN). Versions of this flag were used in the 1970s by the radical anti-Francoist groups Revolutionary Antifascist Patriotic Front (FRAP) and First of October Anti-Fascist Resistance Groups (GRAPO).

The Republican flag is now widely used by trade unions and left-wing political organizations, such as United Left, the Marxist-Leninist Party (RC) and some factions of the Spanish Socialist Workers' Party. It is also used by republican platforms.

Colors

The Spanish Republican Flag has three colours: red, yellow, and dark purple.

The third colour, dark purple, represents Castile and León by recalling the Pendón Morado, the ancient armorial banner of Castile. The colours of red and yellow symbolise the territories of the former Crown of Aragon. These three colours symbolised a new era for Spain in which no part thereof was excluded and all Spaniards were represented.

Morado

Morado, which is a generic word denoting the colour purple or violet, was previously a familiar colour in Spain because it is one of the Catholic liturgical colours that is displayed on vestments, altar cloths, and other ecclesiastical textile furnishings to signify certain seasons of the Catholic liturgical year, and, being a historically Catholic nation, this colour had annual and public use throughout Spain. Also, it was used in antiquity as the heraldic colour of the Kingdom of Castile. The coat of arms of the Kingdom of León bore a purple lion rampant and the flag reputed to have been used in the Revolt of the Comuneros displayed a yellow castle on a purple background. Morado, however, was and is prone to variations in hue and fading from time and use, which often resulted in "morado" denoting a range of hues of purple, which presently are considered distinct colours/hues, e. g. crimson or maroon. Because it is rarely present on flags, in practice the morado of the lowest band of the Flag was coloured violet, purple (purpure), or even lilac, contingent on available materials and dyes.

Controversies
Spanish monarchists resented the morado of the new tricolored flag and a famous soleá was composed when the Flag began to be used. These verses also indirectly expressed dissatisfaction for the reforms of the new republican government:

Modern historians, such as Margarita Márquez Padorno or Mirta Núñez Díaz-Balart, suggest that despite popular belief, the Castilian Pendón Morado never existed or that it was actually red in colour and the morado colour was used merely for aesthetic reasons or due to a lack of historical knowledge.

Until 2001, the official badge of the Real Madrid C.F. had a purple band based either on the Castilian or Spanish republican colours which was added after the proclamation of the Second Spanish Republic in 1931. The colour of the band was changed from morado to navy blue in 2001.

Depictions, derivatives and variants

Civil use

Military use

Present-day use

See also
Flag of Spain
Coat of arms of the Second Spanish Republic
Second Spanish Republic
Himno de Riego
Madrid Distinction

References

External links 

Armada Española - Segunda República (1931 - 1939)
The Flags of Spain. Flags of the World
Asturias Republicana
Ministerio de Defensa - Insignias Jefes de Estado; Presidente de la II República
Second Spanish Republic National Anthem
Images
La bandera de la República Española ondea por primera vez en París
La Bandera Republicana ondea en París

National symbols of Spain
Second Spanish Republic
Second Spanish Republic
Republicanism in Spain
Second Spanish Republic
Second Spanish Republic